Drest son of Girom was a king of the Picts from 522 to 531.

The Pictish Chronicle king lists associate him with Drest III. Various reigns, separately and jointly, are assigned to the two Drests, varying from one to fifteen years. After the joint rule, this Drest appears alone in the lists with a reign of five or four years.

Drest is the first of three possible brothers, all called son of Girom, found in the king lists, the other being his successors Gartnait I and Cailtram.

References
Anderson, Alan Orr, Early Sources of Scottish History A.D 500–1286, volume 1. Reprinted with corrections. Paul Watkins, Stamford, 1990.

External links
Pictish Chronicle 

531 deaths
Pictish monarchs
6th-century Scottish monarchs
Year of birth unknown